Monroy is a municipality located in the province of Cáceres, Extremadura, Spain.

It is located near the Monfragüe National Park.

References 

Municipalities in the Province of Cáceres